Queen of Soul is a nickname most commonly associated with American singer Aretha Franklin (1942–2018).

Queen of Soul may also refer to:

 Several other musicians, see honorific nicknames in popular music
 Queen of Soul (album), 1964 album by Etta James
 Queen of Soul: The Atlantic Recordings, 1992 Aretha Franklin 4-disc box set

See also
 King of Rock and Roll (disambiguation)
 King of Pop (disambiguation)
 Queen of Pop (disambiguation)

Disambiguation pages